The Stadion Dynamo imeni Valeria Lobanovskoho is a multi-functional stadium in Kyiv, Ukraine that is modified for football use only.

It is the home stadium of FC Dynamo Kyiv yet not the main stadium, for which Dynamo uses the bigger NSC Olympiyskiy. The Dynamo Stadium is also a major alternative stadium for the Ukraine national football team that often plays its exhibition games. The stadium holds 16,873 people, and was built in 1934 as Vsevolod Balitsky Dynamo Stadium by the project of Vasyl Osmak as the central stadium of the Ukrainian SSR Dynamo sports society associated with OGPU/NKVD. It was built in the park area next to the NKVD building which is today is known the Government building.

History
The Dynamo Stadium was built in 1934 during transferring of the Soviet capital from Kharkiv to Kyiv. It was built near the newly erected building that was initially intended as a republican NKVD headquarters in Kyiv (today building of the Government of Ukraine).

The stadium current name was given in honour of the former Dynamo Kyiv and USSR national football team coach Valeriy Lobanovskyi in 2002, who died on 13 May that year, at age 63.

In January 2014, the square adjoining the stadium's main gate from Hrushevskoho Street became scene of the month-long street battle between attacking activists of the Euromaidan revolution and police. At several moments, the clashes took place immediately on top of the stadium gate, with at least one rioter filmed being thrown down at the pavement by police officers. The square, the entrance colonnade & stadium fence were completely smoked over by prolonged artificial tyres-fed fire, as well as surrounding street buildings. By 2015, the entrance square was completely restored. The only reminder of the revolution events is an amateur monument erected in the middle of the Hrushevskoho Street driveway opposite the stadium gate. In 2017, new seats were installed as the ground was chosen to host the final of the 2017–18 UEFA Women's Champions League.

Monuments
In 1971, near the stadium was installed a monument of the Dynamo players involved in the game known in the Soviet historiography as the Death Match and the players who perished in the World War II. The sculpture is composed of steel, in which figures of four players are carved using high relief. The architects responsible for the sculpture, V. Bogdanovska and I. Maslenkov, are well known for designing stations of the Kyiv Metro. The sculptor was I. Gorovyi. The monument is located by the service entrance to the stadium, so many fans are unable to see it.

On 11 May 2003, before the first anniversary of the death of Valeriy Lobanovskyi, a monument was opened. The famous coach is sitting on the trainer's bench and is watching a match. The pedestal is a large ball. The total weight is about 5 tonnes. The monument was create by a group of nine people led by the architect Vasil Klimenko and the sculptor Vladimir Filatov. The sculpture is located between the stadium and the main entrance to the stadiums.

Gallery

See also 
Dynamo FC
Dynamo (Ukraine), Ukrainian fitness-sports association

References

External links
 Dynamo Stadium, fanat.com.ua amateur site
 Pylypchuk, B. How comfortable is to attend the UPL games: Lobanovskyi Dynamo Stadium (FC Olimpik) (Наскільки комфортно ходити на матчі УПЛ: стадіон Динамо ім. Валерія Лобановського (ФК Олімпік)). Football 24. 30 March 2017
 Kolomoyets, A. Kiev Dynamo Stadium is 85 years old! (Київському стадіону «Динамо» – 85 років!). Ukrainian Premier League. 11 June 2018

Sports venues completed in 1933
Event venues established in 1933
Sports venues built in the Soviet Union
Football venues in Kyiv
1933 establishments in Ukraine
FC Dynamo Kyiv
Sports venues in Kyiv
Pecherskyi District
Hrushevsky Street (Kyiv)